The following women have served in the House of Representatives of Puerto Rico:

References

Politics of Puerto Rico
Puerto Rico House of Representatives
Lists of women legislators
Reps